Tales from the Dark Multiverse is an American superhero/anthology comic book limited series published by DC Comics, beginning on October 16, 2019. The series takes some of the most famous events in the DC Universe and puts a twist on them.

Plot
Following the Source Wall being shattered at the end of Dark Nights: Metal, the mysterious watcher known as Tempus Fuginaut (introduced in Sideways) begins trying to recruit several "heroes" from across the Dark Multiverse in the wake of a coming crisis.

"Batman: Knightfall"
Azrael/Jean-Paul Valley refuses to give back the mantle of the Batman to Bruce Wayne and defeats him and the Bat-Family, ruling Gotham City as the Saint Batman for 30 years. Bruce, referred to as the Broken, is kept alive, dissected, and tortured as he is forced to watch what Jean-Paul has done to Gotham. With Saint Batman's body failing due to his Venom addiction, Bruce is rescued by the Son of Bane and Shiva and turned into a cyborg. The latter two defeat Saint Batman but Bruce/the Broken, his perception of Gotham warped, kills the two and takes over as Gotham City's new ruler.

"The Death of Superman"
Lois becomes enraged and bitter after the death of Superman by Doomsday's hands, believing the world failed him. After meeting the Eradicator, who failed to bring Superman back to life, Lois proposes that the two merge, turning Lois into the Eradicator. Taking extreme measures to 'make the world a better place', Lois kills Lex Luthor, the Joker and Batman and goes to fight the Cyborg Superman. When the real Superman returns, only for him to be killed by the Cyborg Superman, Lois kills the latter and continues her role as Earth's "savior".

"Blackest Night"
Sinestro never had the powers of the White Lantern taken away, leading to Nekron and the Black Lanterns consuming almost the entirety of the universe. Sinestro, now a Black/White Lantern hybrid called the Limbo Lantern, teams up with the Dove, Lobo, and Mister Miracle, the last mortal beings in the universe, in order to recreate the universe with the Dove as a template for the new universe. However, when Mister Miracle realises that their efforts will just create a new universe and Barda will still be destroyed, he betrays them and the Dove is killed, leaving Sinestro to use Lobo as the template instead after Lobo kills Mister Miracle in revenge. However, the end result is no better, leaving Sinestro to try and find a way to recreate the universe again, as the one he is in has been taken over by new lifeforms who worship Lobo. Eventually, Sinestro decides to leave that universe to reside in the current universe.  Tempus Fuginaut, not wanting that universe to pollute the main universe, uses his powers to leave Sinestro presumably trapped in that universe forever.

"Infinite Crisis"
Ted Kord/the Blue Beetle was not killed by Maxwell Lord and managed to kill the latter instead. Taking control of Brother Eye and Checkmate, Kord tries to bring peace to the universe, with methods deemed questionable by Batman and long-time friend Booster Gold. Alexander Luthor of Earth-3 tries to get Kord to ally with him and destroy multiple Earths to create a single perfect one, but Kord refuses, resulting in Luthor killing the Earth-2 Superman and Lois Lane when they discover the truth, but then being killed himself by Superboy-Prime. Kord teams up with Superboy-Prime and realizes that the only way to bring true peace is to convert everyone into OMACs. Donning a Blue Beetle/Anti-Monitor hybrid armor AND turning himself into an OMAC-inspired cybernetically-enhanced entity with Brother Eye installed into the system, Kord, now dubbing himself as OBAC (One-Beetle-Army-Corps), achieves his plans, at the cost of the lives of several Teen Titan members and Booster Gold.

"Teen Titans: The Judas Contract"
On the night Dick Grayson gives up being Robin, he has a private discussion with Terra and empathizes with her. He tells her that having a mentor can sometimes limit one's ability to forge their own path. Terra reports to Deathstroke shortly afterwards, who reprimands her for opening up to Dick. Inspired by Dick to become more independent, she murders Slade in retaliation and forces Wintergreen to inject her with the same serum that gave Deathstroke his powers. Unlike Slade who was left in a coma for weeks, Terra easily survives. Now calling herself Gaia and viewing herself as a goddess, Terra uses her heightened abilities to murder the Teen Titans, reduce their headquarters to rubble and destroy most of the world by destabilizing Earth's core. Robin and Kid Flash keep Gaia at bay long enough for Superman to arrive, but even the Man of Steel is no match for her, thanks to Gaia's control over kryptonite. After killing Changeling, the last person to care about her, Gaia rules over the broken Earth and forces the survivors to live in constant fear.

"Batman: Hush"
The Elliots are the ones who raise Bruce Wayne instead of Alfred after Bruce's parents are killed. When Thomas Elliot's parents die in a car crash, he grows up to become the Senator of Gotham and CEO of Wayne Enterprises thanks to connections from his girlfriend, Talia al Ghul, the head of the League of Assassins. With the help of Gotham's other elites, they turn Gotham into a militaristic city-state, leading Barbara Gordon to form a rebellion group called the Outsiders after the corrupt police force murdered her father. He also had Bruce committed to Arkham Asylum with help from the facility's lead scientist, Dr. Jonathan Crane. 

During the midst of a power struggle between the League of Assassins and the Court of Owls in the city, Crane and several other members of Gotham's elite are attacked and kidnapped by a man in a bat costume covered in bandages. Thomas initially receives protection from President Lincoln March's head of security from the Court of Owls, Richard Grayson, but the latter turns on him after realizing he and the Batman are connected and that Thomas was making a play for the Wayne family's fortune and presidency. The two are then captured by the Batman, who takes them to an underground prison with Gotham's other elite. Thomas is attacked by the masked man, known as the Silenced, who is revealed to be an insane Bruce Wayne. With Alfred's help, Bruce found out that Thomas had orchestrated the deaths of both of their parents as well as Jim Gordon's. Bruce and Alfred planted a handyman named Jack Napier in Arkham to fake Bruce's death and give him access to several inmates that taught him how to be a skilled warrior. He keeps Thomas and the rest of Gotham's elite in cages that are monitored by Jack and the now-delusional Alfred, who is set to inherit Wayne Industries. Talia begins dating President Lincoln March, and the Silenced sets his sights on taking down the Court of Owls and League of Assassins next.

"War of the Gods"
After the War of the Gods, Wonder Woman is possessed by the magic goddess Hecate, but manages to trap her in her subconsciousness. Phobos, a servant of Hecate, orchestrates an attack on Themyscira and the deaths of Diana's loved ones, causing an emotional response that allows Hecate to take over. Under Hecate's control, she declares war on both the Gods of Olympus and humanity's new gods: superheroes. Diana is eventually defeated by Earth's magic users, but remains under Hecate's control, imprisoned under Themyscira.

"Flashpoint"
When Barry Allen attempts to restore his powers in order to undo the Flashpoint timeline, he dies in the process and Eobard Thawne - the Reverse Flash - takes his place and begins to reshape the world as he desires. After he blackmails the President to grant him authority by killing Aquaman to end the war, Thawne is nearly defeated by 'Superman', only for Superman to be killed by Batman so that Thawne may someday bring Bruce back to life. When Wonder Woman reappears with the New Gods of Apokolips as her gods, Thawne runs back in time to save the Waynes as a deal with Thomas, and then turns his attention to trying to reconstruct reality to make himself the hero.

"Crisis on Infinite Earths"
After the Anti-Monitor’s defeat, it was the Justice League who were forever trapped fighting in Ragnarok. The Justice Society/All-Star Squadron came in to rescue the team but were outmatched by Surtur. Alan Scott then sacrificed himself by becoming the pawn of Surtur known as the Dread Lantern, leading Surtur to other worlds in exchange for his promise that he will always spare Earth.

"Dark Nights: Metal"
When the Justice League banded together with Element X, the energy  corrupted them and they became the Dragons of Barbatos. Barbatos then conquered the Multiverse. All that was left to survive was Duke Thomas. He then assembles a new Justice League, consisting of Detective Chimp with the armor of the Red Tornado, Barry Allen/the Flash who is in a skeletal appearance and has a suit to convert with, Hawkgirl with Hawkman, the latter of which is now a Hawk God, Nightwing who has the Parall-Axe, and the Joker who is now a Joker Dragon. They banded together and defeated the Dragons of Barbatos. Duke Thomas then absorbed the deathwave energy becoming the Last Knight and confronted Tempus Fuginaut.

List of titles

Critical reception 
The entire crossover received generally positive reviews. The entire crossover received an average score of 7.5 out of 10 based on 147 reviews.

Collected editions

References

2019 comics debuts
DC Comics titles
Superhero comics